Camille Joseph Cléroux (1954 – 17 January 2021) was a Canadian serial killer who murdered two of his wives and a female neighbour between 1990 and 2010 in Ottawa. After his arrest for killing his neighbor, the deaths of his wives were investigated, with him eventually admitting to killing both. Cléroux was sentenced to life imprisonment.

Murders

Lise Roy
Cléroux married 27-year-old Lise Roy, a divorcée with a young daughter, on 4 July 1987, and the pair would have a son later on. Their marriage was reportedly happy, but in April 1990, Roy found out that Cléroux had been molesting her 10-year-old daughter. The two engaged in a heated argument in the backyard of their Heatherington Road home, during which Cléroux picked up a rock and struck Roy in the head, killing her. He dismembered her body, wrapped up the remains in butcher paper and put them in garbage bags which he hauled to Heatherington Park. He was seen doing this by a neighbour but they thought nothing of it because Cléroux had a reputation for being somewhat eccentric. Cléroux buried some of the remains in the park and brought the rest back to the house, burying them in the backyard. In order to make himself an alibi, Cléroux went to the police station and claimed that Roy had assaulted him and fled on a bus to Montreal. The police issued an arrest warrant for Roy, after which Cléroux made occasional claims that he had seen her. The day after Roy's murder, neighbours noticed that Cléroux had a brand-new vegetable garden in his backyard, unaware that he had built it on top of Roy's buried remains. Cléroux would later serve prison time for sexually assaulting a child.

Jean Rock
Jean Rock, a troubled young woman who suffered from seizures and had frequent spats with her family, met Cléroux in June 1992 while he was working as a dishwasher at a diner. The couple's common-law marriage was unstable, with the two separating several times because of Cléroux's physically and emotionally abusive behaviour. One day in the fall of 2003, Cléroux took Rock out on a walk through a wooded area near the Walkley Rail Yard, where he beat her to death with a rock and buried her in a shallow grave. In an attempt to cover up Rock's murder, Cléroux paid a female acquaintance to write letters in Rock's name to her family. In the letters, sent 2-3 times a year between 2004 and 2010, the forger claimed that Rock had left Cléroux and was now living with a truck driver named Pierre. Later letters claimed that she had given birth to a daughter and two sons and even included photos of the purported children. Because of this deceit, she was never declared missing.

In 2004, the area where Rock's remains were buried was being developed into housing. Fearing the grave could be discovered, Cléroux dug up Rock's remains and moved them to a new grave on the other side of the railroad tracks. In 2006, when he noticed that animals had tried to take Rock's bones, Cléroux put them in a produce bag and used a shopping cart to move them all the way to the Bronson Bridge spanning the Rideau Canal. After weighting the bag with some stones, he threw it into the water. The remains were discovered in October of that year when the canal was drained, but they could not be identified.

Paula Leclair
By 2010, Cléroux was living at a nearby high-rise building where he was neighbours with 64-year-old Paula Leclair. Cléroux was jealous that Leclair's apartment was more spacious and had a better view. He asked Leclair to give him the apartment, but she refused. On May 20, 2010, he asked Leclair to accompany him on a walk near Fairlea Park. Upon entering the woods, Cléroux forced her to a shallow grave with a knife he had stolen from the diner where he worked. After they reached the grave, he stabbed Leclair in the back and hit her in the head with a rock. After burying the body and taking her keys, Cléroux returned to the apartment where he started gathering Leclair's belongings and throwing them into a dumpster. When questioned about her whereabouts, he claimed that Leclair had recently won the lottery and was on vacation at Walt Disney World in Florida and, upon returning to Canada, she would move in with her son at his new apartment in Gatineau.

Trial and imprisonment
On May 29, 2010, Paula Leclair's son, André, who had not heard from her in several days, decided to drop by at her apartment to check on her. He opened the door using a spare key and was shocked to find that the space was filled with another person's belongings. At that moment, Cléroux walked out from an elevator, coolly explaining to André that his mother had given him the apartment and asked him to give the spare key back. Unconvinced by his explanation, André went to the police and informed them of the suspicious transaction. While the authorities were investigating, Cléroux instructed his forger to write a letter claiming to be Leclair, explaining that she had given the apartment to her neighbour willingly and to stop pestering him. In an attempt to convince them of the ownership, Cléroux met with Detective John Monette of the Ottawa Police Service to explain the situation. At the end of their two-hour interview, however, he admitted to killing Paula Leclair in cold blood.

Cléroux was charged with the murder and, while investigating his past, authorities discovered that both of his previous wives had vanished in a suspicious manner. When pressed on the issue, Cléroux admitted that he had killed both of them as well. On October 31, 2011, Lise Roy's remains were found under the vegetable garden at Cléroux's former home. Shortly after, the remains found in the Rideau Canal were positively identified as Jean Rock's. At trial, Cléroux sat expressionless while the details of horrid crimes were described in court. At one point, Jean Rock's father, John, suffered a stroke and had to be escorted out of the courtroom, muttering under his breath that he was going to kill Cléroux. Cléroux pleaded guilty to all three murders, and was sentenced to life imprisonment, with a chance of parole after 25 years. During sentencing, Justice Lynn Ratushny said that he deserved nothing else than to be in custody for the rest of his life, with the families of the victims now being able to live in peace knowing that their daughters' killer would never be released.

Cléroux died from apparent natural causes at the Pacific Institution & Regional Reception Centre in Abbotsford, aged 67.

See also
 List of serial killers by country

References

External links
 Photos related to the case

1954 births
2021 deaths
20th-century Canadian criminals
21st-century Canadian criminals
Canadian male criminals
Canadian people convicted of child sexual abuse
Canadian people convicted of murder
Canadian prisoners sentenced to life imprisonment
Canadian serial killers
Franco-Ontarian people
Male serial killers
People convicted of murder by Canada
People from Ottawa
Crime in Ottawa
Prisoners sentenced to life imprisonment by Canada
Serial killers who died in prison custody
Uxoricides
Violence against women in Canada